The Eagle River Timber Bridge is a wooden arch bridge carrying highway M-26 over the Eagle River in Eagle River, Michigan. It opened in 1990 as a replacement for the historic Lake Shore Drive Bridge that runs parallel to it.

History
Construction on the bridge began in 1988. The quantity of wood used was equivalent to three or four average-size houses. The bridge opened for highway M-26 traffic in 1990, at which point the neighboring Lake Shore Drive Bridge was restricted to pedestrian use.

On August 26, 1992, the bridge was entered into the 1992 Timber Bridge Design and Construction Award Competition. It was awarded first place in the "Long Span Vehicular Bridges" category.

Design
The bridge is primarily constructed of wood joined together with steel connectors. It is supported by two adjacent arches: one spans  and the other . Each arch is constructed from two curved sections joined together by a crown hinge. The road deck is made of wood and covered by an asphalt road surface.

All the timber members were structural glued laminated and pressure treated with preservative pentachlorophenol in oil. Any wooden portions which were cut or drilled also had an application of copper naphthenate. The steel pins in the hinges at the crown and abutments were chrome plated to reduce friction and prevent corrosion. All other steel was hot-dipped galvanized, given a tie-coat, and covered by epoxy and a top coat of brown urethane, a system designed to provide thirty years of protection. The engineered timber members were manufactured in Peshtigo, Wisconsin by Sentinel Structures, Inc.

Bridge maintenance consists of reapplying preservative to all wooden members and any necessary tightening of bolts.

Notes

References

Further reading
Washtenaw Impressions - March 1996 Contains brief mention on page 2

External links

Road bridges in Michigan
Wooden bridges in Michigan
Open-spandrel deck arch bridges in the United States
Bridges completed in 1990
Transportation in Keweenaw County, Michigan
Buildings and structures in Keweenaw County, Michigan
M-26 (Michigan highway)